The following is a timeline of the history of the city of Split, Croatia.

Prior to the 19th century

 3rd or 2nd C. BCE – Split founded as a colony of Issa
 78 BCE – Salona taken by Romans.
 310 CE – Diocletian's Palace built near Salona.
 4th C. CE – Diocletianus Aqueduct constructed.
 639 – Salona sacked by Avars; refugees settle at nearby Spalatum.
 998 – Venetian Doge Pietro Orseolo is granted the title of "Duke of Dalmatia" by the Emperor Basil II (Venice is a nominal vassal of the Byzantine Emperors).
 1019 – First Bulgarian Empire destroyed, direct Byzantine rule restored to Split by Basil II (Venice stops using the title "Duke of Dalmatia").
 1069 – Split acknowledges nominal suzerainty of Croatian King Peter Krešimir IV.
 1084 – The title of "Duke of Dalmatia" granted once more to Venetian doges by Emperor Alexius I Comnenus, but the town remains under overlordship of King Demetrius Zvonimir.
 1091 – Byzantine Emperor Alexius joins the old Theme of Dalmatia to the Empire.
 1096 – Emperor Alexius grants the administration of Dalmatia to the Doge of Venice.
 1100 – Bell tower of the Cathedral of Saint Domnius constructed.
 1105 – Split surrenders to King Coloman of Hungary.
 1116 – Venetian Doge Ordelafo Faliero de Doni retakes the city from Hungary.
 1117 – Ordelafo Faliero is defeated and falls in battle with the Hungarians, city submits to Hungary.
 1118 – Doge Domenico Michele defeats Stephen II of Hungary and re-establishes Venetian sovereignty
 1124 – While Domenico Michele is engaged in battle with Byzantium, Stephen II retakes Split and the other Dalmatian cities.
 1125 – Doge Domenico Michele returns and retakes Split and the Dalmatian cities.
 1141 – Géza II of Hungary conquers Bosnian lands and re-establishes Hungarian rule in the city.
 1171 – Emperor Manuel I Comnenus of the Byzantine Empire restores Imperial control in Split for the last time.
 1180 – Death of Manuel I, Hungary re-assumes sovereignty.
 1241 – City unsuccessfully besieged by Tartar forces.
 1244 – King Bela IV transfers the election of Dalmatian city governors, that were previously done by cities themselves, to the Ban of Croatia.
 1327 – Venice reclaims the city.
 1357 – Venetian forces expelled from Split, Hungary back in power.
 1390 – Tvrtko I of Bosnia in power.
 1391 – Death of Tvrtko I, Split returns to Hungarian overlordship.
 1420 – City becomes a possession of Venice, and remains under Venetian rule for the following 377 years.
 1432 – Loggia built.
 1481 – Hrvoja Tower built.
 1670 – An outer ring of modern walls is built.
 1797 – Split ceded to the Habsburg monarchy by the Treaty of Campo Formio.

19th century
 1805 – After the defeat of the Third Coalition and the consequent Treaty of Pressburg, Split becomes part of the Kingdom of Italy.
 1806 – Split becomes part of the French Empire.
 1809 – Illyrian Provinces established.
 1813 – Split occupied by Austria.
 1815 – Split officially ceded to Austria following the Congress of Vienna.
 1820 Split Archaeological Museum, oldest museum in Croatia, established by a decree of the Dalmatian government. 
 1830 – Catholic diocese of Spalato-Macarsca established.
 1851 – Population: 10,787.
 1860 – Antonio Bajamonti of the Autonomist Party becomes mayor.
 1864 – Bajamonti relieved of duties due to his opposition to Austrian centralism, Frano Lanza appointed mayor.
 1865 – Bajamonti reelected for mayor.
 1880 – Split county council dissolved, Aleksandar Nallini appointed commissary of Split.
 1882 – People's Party wins elections for the first time, Dujam Rendić-Miočević becomes mayor.
 1885 – Gajo Bulat becomes mayor.
 1893 – Split Municipal Theatre opens.
 1900 – Population: 27,198.
1922- New building of Split Archaeological Museum opened to public.

20th century

 1911 – HNK Hajduk Split football team formed.
 1918 – Ivo Tartaglia becomes mayor.
 1924 – Museum of Natural History founded.
 1925 – Zagreb-Split railway constructed.
 1929 – Split becomes seat of the Littoral Banovina administrative region of Yugoslavia.
 1931 – Gallery of Fine Arts founded.
 1941 – Split annexed by Italy, becomes part of the Governorate of Dalmatia and capital of the province of Spalato.
 1943
 Split liberated by Yugoslav Partisans following the capitulation of Italy, later retaken by Nazi Germany
 Slobodna Dalmacija newspaper begins publication.
 1944 – Split liberated for the second and final time, becomes part of the Federal State of Croatia of Yugoslavia.
 1954 –  founded.
 1960 – Split Festival of music begins.
 1966 – Split Airport opens in Kaštela.
 1971 - Population: 152,905.
 1974 – University of Split established.
 1976 – Museum of Croatian Archaeological Monuments opens.
 1979 – Poljud Stadium built.
 1990 – City hosts 1990 European Athletics Championships.
 1991
 6 May: Protest against Yugoslav People's Army.
 14–16 November: Battle of the Dalmatian Channels occurs near city.
 Population: 200,459.
 1993
 Split-Dalmatia County assembly begins meeting.
 Sister city relationship established with Los Angeles, USA.
 1995 –  begins broadcasting.
 1997 - Croatian Maritime Museum established.
 1998 – Croatia Boat Show begins.
 1999 – Splitska Televizija (television station) founded.

21st century

 2001 – February: Political protest.
 2005 – A1 motorway (Zagreb-Split) constructed.
 2006 – Split Suburban Railway begins operating.
 2008 – Spaladium Arena opens.
 2009 – 24 July: Train derailment at Rudine, near Split.
 2011
 Split Pride begins.
 Population: 178,192; metro 349,314.
 2013 - 1 July: Croatia becomes part of the European Union.

See also
 History of Split
 List of mayors of Split
 Timelines of other cities in Croatia: Rijeka, Zagreb

References

This article incorporates information from the Croatian Wikipedia.

Bibliography

published in 18th-19th centuries

 
 
 
 
 
 

published in 20th century
 
 
 
 
 
 
 
 
 

published in 21st century

External links

 Europeana. Items related to Split, various dates.

 

Split
Split